Shreya Ghoshal (born 12 March 1984) is an Indian playback singer. She sings in Hindi, Telugu, Tamil,  Malayalam, Kannada, Marathi, Gujarati, Bengali, Assamese, Nepali, Oriya, Bhojpuri, Punjabi and Tulu languages. Ghoshal's career began when she won the Sa Re Ga Ma Pa contest as an adult. Her Bollywood playback singing career began with Sanjay Leela Bhansali's Devdas, for which she received her first National Film Award for Best Female Playback Singer along with Filmfare Award for Best Female Playback Singer and Filmfare RD Burman Award for New Music Talent. Since then, she has received many other awards. Apart from playback singing, Ghoshal has appeared as a judge on several television reality shows. She performs in musical concerts around the world. She was also honored from the U.S. state of Ohio, where the governor Ted Strickland declared 26 June 2010 as "Shreya Ghoshal Day". In April 2013, she was awarded with the highest honour in London by the selected members of "House of Commons of the United Kingdom". In July 2015, John Cranley, the Mayor of the City of Cincinnati also honoured her by proclaiming 24 July 2015 as "Shreya Ghoshal Day of Entertainment and Inspiration" in Cincinnati. She was also featured five times in Forbes list of the top 100 celebrities of India. In 2017, Ghoshal became the first Indian singer to have a wax statute of her in  Madame Tussauds Museum, Delhi. She also debuted as producer with her first single Dhadkane Azad Hain.

Film songs 
She sang more than 200 songs in Tamil.

2002

2003

2004

2005

2006

2007

2008

2009

2010

2011

2012

2013

2014

2015

2016

2017

2018

2019

2021

2022

Non-film songs

2007

2014

2015

2016

2022

References

External links 
 Tamil songs by Shreya Ghoshal on Raaga

Tamil
Ghoshal, Shreya
Ghoshal, Shreya